Yusuf Emre Fırat (born 20 March 2000) is a Turkish Olympian cross-country skier.

Early years
Yusuf Emre Fırat was born in Kars, Turkey on 20 March 2000.

Sports career
Fırat performs cross-country skiing. He is a member of Kars Gençlik Sports Club.

He participated in the sprint, 15 km freestyle and team sprint events at the 2017 European Youth Olympic Winter Festival as well as at the  FIS Nordic World Ski Championships in 2019 and 2021. He won the gold medal at the Ski Running International FIS Competition held in Erzurum, Turkey.

He competed at the 2022 Winter Olympics in Beijing, China.

See also
Turkey at the 2022 Winter Olympics

References

External links 
 

TMOK Profili

2000 births
Living people
Sportspeople from Kars
Turkish male cross-country skiers
Olympic cross-country skiers of Turkey
Cross-country skiers at the 2022 Winter Olympics
21st-century Turkish people